, also known as  was a Japanese general and businessman hailing from the Kubota Domain and founder of the  during the Bakumatsu period of Japan.

Biography
He was born in Yokote in May 1849. On August 3, 1868, when his father became a chief retainer of the Kubota Domain, he was handed over to Yokote Shodai.

In 1884, he became the mayor of Kawabe, and then the mayor of Kazuno and Hiraka.

References

Bibliography
Akita Bank's 100 Year History (Akita Bank 100 Year History Compilation Room, 1979 )
Yokote City History
300 Clan Biographical Dictionary (Vassal Encyclopedia Compilation Committee, 1987 )

1849 births
1906 deaths
People of Edo-period Japan
People of Meiji-period Japan
People from Yokote, Akita
19th-century Japanese businesspeople
People of the Boshin War